Nedenes Amts Landbotidende was a Norwegian newspaper, published in Arendal in Aust-Agder county.

Nedenes Amts Landbotidende was started in 1879. It went defunct in 1903.

References

Newspapers established in 1879
Publications disestablished in 1903
Defunct newspapers published in Norway
Mass media in Arendal
Norwegian-language newspapers